Dahigaon is a village in the Karmala taluka of Solapur district in Maharashtra state, India.

Demographics
Covering  and comprising 308 households at the time of the 2011 census of India, Dahigaon had a population of 1683. There were 875 males and 808 females, with 267 people being aged six or younger.

References

Villages in Karmala taluka